Mount Washington is a mountain in White Pine County in the state of Nevada.

Land near the summit and adjoining the national park was purchased in 2001 by The Long Now Foundation as a potential site for the Clock of the Long Now.  The announcement of the land purchase was made at Baker, the gateway town of the national park, and in nearby Ely, Nevada, at a gathering of White Pine County officials sponsored by Ely's Economic Diversification Council. The property was described as  made up of eleven patented mining claims dating back to 1916.

References

Mountains of White Pine County, Nevada
Washington
Great Basin National Park